MBSL may refer to:

Multi-bubble sonoluminescence
Moser Baer Solar Limited